James Smyth (1683-1759) was an 18th-century Anglican priest in Ireland.

The son of Bishop William Smyth, and of Mary Povey, daughter of Sir John Povey, Lord Chief Justice of Ireland,  he was born in Raphoe and educated at Trinity College, Dublin. Smyth was  Archdeacon of Meath from 1732 until his death in 1759.

He married Catherine Vesey, one of the numerous children of John Vesey, Archbishop of Tuam, by his second wife Anne Muschamp, and had several children.

References

1683 births
1799 deaths
Alumni of Trinity College Dublin
18th-century Irish Anglican priests
Archdeacons of Meath